MacDonald, Macdonald, and McDonald are surnames of both Irish and Scottish Origin. In the Scottish Gaelic and Irish languages they are patronymic, referring to an ancestor with given name Donald.

Origins and variants 
The name is a patronym meaning 'son of Dòmhnall'. The personal name  is composed of the elements  'world' and  'might, rule'. According to Alex Woolf, the Gaelic personal name is probably a borrowing from the British Celtic .

In the context of Scottish clans, the various forms of the name refer to one of the largest clans, Clan Donald. In Ireland the name is largely from this root but may sometimes be a synonym for MacDonnell, which itself may be of distinct Scottish Clan Donald galloglass or native Irish origins.

Frequency and distribution
In Scottish surname data, no distinction is made between, for instance, "Macdonald" and "MacDonald". According to these data, the following frequency information can be collated:

Table references

Frequency data from England of 1891 shows a concentration of families bearing the "Macdonald" surname in Lancashire and Yorkshire with a lower frequency in the northernmost counties, but overall widespread distribution throughout the country. "McDonald" shares the same pattern of distribution. In contemporaneous data from the United States, coast-to-coast distribution of both "Macdonald" and "McDonald" appears in 1880. Looking back to 1840 in the United States, the prevalence of "McDonald" is far greater than that of "Macdonald", with concentration in the Ohio-Pennsylvania-New York corridor.

Notable people: MacDonald surname
Born before 1400
Aonghus Mór (died c. 1293), son of Domhnall mac Raghnaill, and can be regarded as the first MacDonald
Aonghus Óg of Islay (died 1314 × 1318/c. 1330), Chief of Clan Donald and ally of Robert the Bruce
John of Islay, Lord of the Isles (died 1386), First Lord of the Isles and Chief of Clan Donald
Donald of Islay, Lord of the Isles (died 1423), Second Lord of the Isles
Alexander of Islay, Earl of Ross (died 1449), Third Lord of the Isles; ally then rival of his relative, James I of Scotland

Born after 1400
John of Islay, Earl of Ross (1434–1503), or "John MacDonald", Scottish ruler, Fourth Lord of the Isles and Chief of the Highland Clan Donald
Aonghas Óg (died 1490), bastard son of John of Islay and last of the MacDonald Lords of the Isles
Alasdair Mac Colla (1610–1647), or Sir Alexander MacDonald, Scottish/Irish military commander during the Wars of the Three Kingdoms 

Born after 1700
Flora MacDonald (1722–1790), Jacobite patriot who protected Bonnie Prince Charlie after the 1746 Battle of Culloden
Jacques MacDonald (1765–1840), 1st Duke of Taranto, French military officer and Marshal of the Empire under Napoleon I (2nd generation French; father was Scottish)
John MacDonald of Garth (1771–1866), Scottish emigrant to Canada, early partner in the North West Company
John Small MacDonald (c. 1791 – 1849), Canadian businessman and provincial politician

Born after 1800
Annie MacDonald (1832–1897), British courtier, Dresser (lady's maid) to Queen Victoria of Great Britain
A. B. MacDonald (born c. 1861), American journalist
Beatrice Mary MacDonald (1881–1969), American Army nurse during World War I
Bob MacDonald (golfer) (1885–1960), Scottish-American golfer
Claude Maxwell MacDonald (1852–1915), British soldier and diplomat
Elizabeth Roberts MacDonald (1864–1922), Canadian writer, suffragist
George MacDonald (1824–1905), Scottish-English author, poet, and Christian minister
Hector MacDonald (1853–1903), Scottish Major-General of the British Army under Lord Kitchener
John Alexander Macdonald (1815–1891), first Prime minister of Canada, usually referred to as John A. Macdonald
John L. MacDonald (1838–1903), Scottish-American national politician
Pirie MacDonald (1867–1942), American portrait photographer
Ramsay MacDonald (1866–1937), Scottish politician, twice Prime Minister of the United Kingdom (son of "Macdonald" father and "Ramsay" mother, registered at birth as "James McDonald Ramsay")
Ranald MacDonald (1834–1894), Scottish-Chinook educator. First man to teach the English language in Japan
William Josiah MacDonald (1873–1946), American lawyer and national politician

Born after 1900

Jeanette MacDonald (1903–1965), American singer and actress
Jimmy MacDonald (sound effects artist) (1906–1991), Scottish-born American sound designer at Disney
Jack Macdonald (sportsman) (1908–1982), New Zealand rower
James Macdonald (ornithologist) (1908–2002), Scottish-Australian ornithologist
Ian MacDonald (actor) (1914–1978), American actor and director during the 1940s and 1960s
Ross Macdonald (1915–1983), pseudonym of the American-Canadian writer Kenneth Millar
John D. MacDonald (1916–1986), American novelist
Virginia B. MacDonald (1920–2008), American politician
Charles B. MacDonald (1922–1990), American World War II soldier and military historian
Flora MacDonald (politician) (1926–2015), Canadian politician
Peter MacDonald (Navajo leader) (born 1928), former chairman of the Navajo Nation
Robert David MacDonald (1929–2004), Scottish playwright, director and translator
Jeffrey R. MacDonald (born 1943), American murderer
Margo MacDonald (1943–2014), Scottish politician
Kevin B. MacDonald (born 1944), American psychology academic
Ralph MacDonald (1944–2011), American percussionist, songwriter
Linda MacDonald (born 1946), American multimedia artist and quilter

Born after 1950
Alan MacDonald (rugby union) (born 1985), Scottish rugby union player
Andrew MacDonald (ice hockey) (born 1986), Canadian ice hockey player
Andrew McDonald (water polo) (born 1955), American water polo player 
Ann-Marie MacDonald (born 1958), Canadian playwright, novelist, actor and broadcast journalist
Duck MacDonald Andrew Duck MacDonald (born 1953), American heavy metal/hard rock guitarist
Fiona MacDonald (born 1974), Scottish curler
Garry MacDonald (born 1962), English footballer
Heidi MacDonald, American comic book editor and comics critic
Jacob MacDonald (born 1993), American ice hockey player
Jason MacDonald (born 1975), Canadian mixed martial artist
Kevin MacDonald (footballer) (born 1960), Scottish footballer
Kiaran MacDonald, English boxer
Kirk MacDonald (ice hockey) (born 1983), Canadian ice hockey player
Kirk MacDonald (politician) (b. 1975), member of the Legislative Assembly of New Brunswick 
Linda MacDonald (activist), Canadian activist against Non-State Torture
Mike MacDonald (comedian) (born 1954), Canadian comedian and actor
Mike MacDonald (rugby union) (born 1980), American rugby union player
Ray MacDonald (born 1977), Thai actor
Roddie MacDonald (born 1954), Scottish footballer
Roddy (R.S.) MacDonald (born 1956), Scottish-Australian Pipe Major and composer
Rory MacDonald (fighter) (born 1989), Canadian mixed martial artist
Shaun MacDonald (born 1988), Welsh footballer
Tom MacDonald (rapper) (born 1988), Canadian rapper, songwriter
William J. MacDonald (writer and producer), American television writer and producer

Notable people: Macdonald surname
Born after 1700
Allan Macdonald (1794–1862), New York politician
Lawrence Macdonald (1799 – c. 1870), Scottish sculptor
Étienne Macdonald (1765–1840), Marshal of the Empire

Born after 1800
John Sandfield Macdonald (1812–1872), Canadian national politician, First Premier of Ontario 
 Sir John A. Macdonald (1815–1891), Scottish-Canadian national politician, first Prime Minister of Canada
Donald Alexander Macdonald (1817–1896), Canadian national politician
John Macdonald (Canadian politician) (1824–1890), Scottish-Canadian merchant, churchman, philanthropist and national politician
William Christoper Macdonald (1831–1917), Scottish-Canadian tobacco manufacturer, philanthropist 
 Captain Murdo Stewart MacDonald (1852–1938), Scottish sailor, the last Sea Baron, Lloyd's Surveyor of Shipping
Charles B. Macdonald (1855–1939), American golfer, introduced the first 18-hole course in the United States
C. Leslie Macdonald (1856–1929), Australian racehorse owner
Alexander Macdonald (New York politician) (1867–1935), American politician and conservationist
John Smyth Macdonald (1867–1941), British physiologist
Harry Macdonough (born John Macdonald, 1871–1931), Canadian singer and recording executive
John Alexander Macdonald (Prince Edward Island politician) (1874–1948), Canadian national politician
William Alexander Macdonald (fl. 1890s), Canadian provincial politician
William Ross Macdonald (1891–1976), Canadian national politician
Ab Macdonald Albert Macdonald (1896 – after 1967), South Australian horse trainer

Born after 1900
Archibald 'Archie' James Florence Macdonald (1904–1983), British Liberal MP
Barbara Macdonald (1913–2000), American social worker, lesbian feminist and ageism activist
Dwight Macdonald (1906–1982), American writer, editor, social critic, philosopher, and political radical
Eleanor Josephine Macdonald (1906–2007), pioneer American cancer epidemiologist and cancer researcher
John Michael Macdonald (1906–1997), Canadian national politician
Jack Macdonald (sportsman) (1908–1982), New Zealand rower
James David Macdonald (ornithologist) (1908–2002), British and Australian ornithologist 
Margaret Mary Macdonald (1910–1968), Canadian national politician
Callum Macdonald (1912–1999), Scottish publisher who specialised in poetry
James David Macdonald (politician) (1922–1995), Canadian politician
Ian G. Macdonald (born 1928), English mathematician, a prominent contributor to algebraic combinatorics
Ian Macdonald (Australian politician) (born 1945), Australian national politician
Ian Macdonald (New South Wales politician) (born 1949), Australian state politician

Born after 1950

 Dame Mary Macdonald (born 1950), British head teacher, honoured for services to education
Amy MacDonald (writer) (born 1951), American writer and journalist
Ken Macdonald (born 1953), British barrister, Director of Public Prosecutions and Head of the Crown Prosecution Service 2003–2008
Norm Macdonald (1959–2021), Canadian comedian, writer and actor
 Sarah Macdonald (journalist) (born 1966), Australian journalist
Kevin Macdonald (director) (born 1967), Scottish film director (The Last King of Scotland, Touching the Void)
Shona Macdonald (born 1969), Scottish artist
Shauna MacDonald (Canadian actress) (born 1970), Canadian actress and filmmaker
Kelly Macdonald (born 1976), Scottish actress
Shauna Macdonald (Scottish actress) (born 1981), Scottish stage, television and film actress
Amy Macdonald (born 1987), Scottish singer/songwriter

Ross Macdonald (born 1989), bassist for The 1975
Nene Macdonald (born 1994), Papua New Guinean Rugby League player
Louise Macdonald (active 2020s), charity leader in Scotland, national director of the Institute of Directors in Scotland

Notable people: McDonald surname
Born after 1800
Ambrose Stephen McDonald (1845–1913), American businessman and politician
Eugene F. McDonald (1886–1958), American entrepreneur, founder of Zenith Radio
Harl McDonald (1899–1955), American composer, pianist, conductor and teacher
Jack McDonald (ice hockey, born 1887) (died 1958), Canadian ice hockey player
James Grover McDonald (1886–1964), American diplomat, first Ambassador to Israel
John McDonald (of Dromod) (1846 – aft. 1911), Irish cultural nationalist poet
Winifred McDonald (1888–1976), Secretary of the State of Connecticut

Born after 1900
Albert McDonald (1930–2014), American politician
 Sir Arthur McDonald (1903–1996), British West Indian-English Royal Air Force Air Marshal
Barry McDonald (rugby union) (1940–2020), Australian rugby union player
Country Joe McDonald (born 1942), American musician and activist
Janet McDonald (mathematician) (1905–2006), American mathematician, Vassar College professor emerita
John P. McDonald (1922–1993), American librarian
K. J. McDonald (1930–2012), American politician
Ian McDonald (musician) (born 1946), English rock musician
Larry McDonald (1935–1983), member of the United States House of Representatives
Laurier McDonald (born 1931), Texas Attorney, historian, author
Mac McDonald (born 1949), American actor
Marie McDonald (1923–1965), American film actress
Martha McDonald (born 1964), American artist
Maurice McDonald (1902–1971), American fast food pioneer and co-founder of McDonald's
Parker Lee McDonald (1924–2017), American judge
Richard McDonald (1909–1998), American fast food pioneer and co-founder of McDonald's
Roy McDonald (poet) (1937-2018), Canadian poet and busker
Roy McDonald (politician) (born 1946), New York State Senator
Sandy McDonald (1937–2016), Scottish Minister of the Church of Scotland
Susan Marshall McDonald (1918–1992), philatelist of Ohio
 Sir Trevor McDonald (born George McDonald, 1939), Trinidadian-born British news presenter
W. Ian McDonald (1933–2006), New Zealand neurologist, academic, and specialist in multiple sclerosis
Walt McDonald (1934-2022), American poet, academic, Poet Laureate of Texas
Wesley L. McDonald (1924–2009), United States Navy Four Star Admiral and naval aviator
Whitey McDonald (1902–1956), Canadian soccer player
William Joseph McDonald (1904–1989), Irish-born American Catholic bishop

Born after 1950
Amy McDonald (Scottish footballer) (born 1985), Scottish football player/coach
Ariel McDonald (born 1972), American-Slovenian basketball player
Audra McDonald (born 1970), American actress and singer
Andy McDonald (born 1958), British Labour Party politician
Andy McDonald (born 1977), Canadian ice hockey player
Barry McDonald (gymnast) (born 1971), Irish gymnast
Chris McDonald (footballer) (born 1975), Scottish footballer
Christopher McDonald (actor) (born 1955), American actor
Cole McDonald (born 1998), American football player
Elizabeth McDonald (born 1985), American artist
Hugh McDonald (American musician) (born 1950), American musician, bassist
Clayton McDonald (born 1988), English footballer
Daniel McDonald (actor) (1960–2007), American actor
David Tennant (born David John McDonald, 1971), Scottish actor
Ian McDonald (author) (born 1960), English science fiction novelist (residence in Northern Ireland)
Joe McDonald (politician) (born 1966), American politician
John McDonald (born 1974), American baseball player
Kathryn McDonald American medical scientist
Kevin McDonald (born 1961), Canadian comedian and actor
Kevin McDonald (footballer, born 1985), English footballer
Kevin McDonald (footballer, born 1988), Scottish footballer
Lanny McDonald (born 1953), Canadian ice hockey player
Mackenzie McDonald (born 1995), American tennis player
Mark McDonald (politician) (born 1980), Scottish politician
Margaret McDonald (voice actress) (born 1988), American voice actress
Meg McDonald (footballer) (born 1991), Australian rules footballer
Michael McDonald (singer) (born 1952), American singer
Mickey McDonald (born 1995), American baseball player
Miriam McDonald (born 1987), Canadian actress
Neil McDonald (footballer) (born 1965), English footballer and coach
Rod McDonald (footballer, born 1967), English footballer
Rod McDonald (footballer, born 1992), English footballer
Scott McDonald (born 1983), Australian footballer
Shawn McDonald (born 1978), American Christian singer, songwriter and guitarist
Simon McDonald (diplomat) (born 1961), British diplomat
Will McDonald IV (born 1999), American football player

Pseudonyms
Abby McDonald, pen-name of British author Abigal Hass
Ian MacDonald (born Ian MacCormick, 1948–2003), British music critic and author

Fictional characters
Ronald "Mac" McDonald, character in It's Always Sunny in Philadelphia
Ronald McDonald, international fast-food franchise clown mascot and spokesman
 Old MacDonald, title character of the traditional children's song Old MacDonald Had a Farm

 Several characters from the British soap opera Coronation Street, including:
Amy McDonald
Andy McDonald
Becky McDonald
Karen McDonald
Jim McDonald
Liz McDonald
Ruairi McDonald
Steve McDonald
Tracy McDonald
Vicky McDonald'

See also
McDonald v. City of Chicago

Ambiguous human name pages

References

Anglicised Scottish Gaelic-language surnames
Scottish surnames
English-language surnames
Patronymic surnames
Surnames from given names